Tillandsia heliconioides is a plant species in the genus Tillandsia. This species is native to Mexico, Central America (Belize, Costa Rica, Guatemala, Honduras, Nicaragua and Panama) and South America (Bolivia, Brazil, Colombia, Ecuador, French Guiana, Guyana, Peru, Suriname, and Venezuela).

References

heliconioides
Flora of Central America
Flora of South America
Flora of Mexico
Plants described in 1816